Kavita Thakur born 10 january 1993 is representative for India in the sport of Kabaddi from Jagatsukh, Manali, Himachal Pradesh. She was a member of the team that won a gold medal in the 2014 Asian Games in Incheon.

References

External links
Profile

Living people
Indian kabaddi players
Asian Games medalists in kabaddi
Kabaddi players at the 2014 Asian Games
Kabaddi players at the 2018 Asian Games
Asian Games gold medalists for India
Asian Games silver medalists for India
Medalists at the 2014 Asian Games
Medalists at the 2018 Asian Games
Place of birth missing (living people)
Year of birth missing (living people)